James Alexander Hart (born October 30, 1955) is a Canadian politician.

Early years
Hart was born in Edmonton, Alberta, was educated in Calgary and completed his military training at Canadian Forces Fleet School Halifax, CFB Borden and CFB Esquimalt. He served in the Canadian Forces twice, first for 5 years in the navy. After training as an Electrical Technician Hart served on 3 of Her Majesty's Canadian Ship's; (HMCS) Gatineau, Qu'Appelle and Yukon. Hart served an addition 5 years as a Canadian Armed Forces Reserve officer and Commanding Officer of the 902 Kiwanis Air Cadet Squadron. Mr. Hart completed his broadcasting training at the Columbia Academy of Radio and Television Arts in Vancouver, British Columbia in 1981. Hart has also studied at the Canadian Securities Institute, completing the Canadian Securities Course and the Ethics, Conduct and Practices Program.  Prior to entering political life, Hart worked in the broadcasting industry as radio host, television host, account executive and radio station manager.

Political career
In 1988, Hart was elected to municipal government and served two terms as a Trustee.  In 1989, he joined a new national political movement, the Reform Party of Canada, which became the Canadian Alliance in 2000.

Hart was first elected 1993 to represent the riding of Okanagan—Similkameen—Merritt, British Columbia, in the Canadian parliament. He was re-elected in 1997 in the new riding of Okanagan—Coquihalla.

In 1998, as a member of Canada's official opposition, he was elected by his peers as the Vice Chairman of the House Standing Committee of Defense and Veterans’ Affairs. As well, Hart was appointed as Chief Opposition Critic for a number of senior portfolios including Defense, Veterans’ Affairs, and Justice.  He also served as an executive member on the Canada/Japan and NATO Parliamentary Associations. After publicly attacking Reform Party leader Preston Manning and accepting the Parliamentary Pension Plan, Hart briefly quit the Reform caucus before publicly apologizing to be accepted back into the caucus.

In March 1996 Hart accused Jean-Marc Jacob, Member of Parliament for Charlesbourg, of sedition for a 1995 communique sent by him (Jacob) to members of the Armed Forces in Quebec concerning the October 30, 1995 separation referendum in that province. The Speaker ruled the matter prima facie, Mr. Hart moved a motion, which after debate was amended, and the House referred the matter to committee for study. See debates, March 12, 1996, pp. 557–67; March 13, 1996, pp. 648–74; March 14, 1996, pp. 680–703; March 18, 1996, pp 854–9. On June 18, 1996 the Standing Committee on Procedure and House Affairs presented its Twenty-Ninth Report which found that although Mr. Jacobs actions were ill-advised, there was no contempt of the House. See Journals June 18, 1996, pp. 565–6; June 20, 1996, pp. 592–3 (House of Commons Procedure and Practice, Robert Marleau and Camille Montpetit )The communique urged Canadian Armed Forces personnel, along with equipment and military hardware to immediately join the new Quebec Armed Forces the day after a "yes" vote in the referendum. The referendum failed to win a majority.

Inquiry
Hart resigned as a Member of Parliament in order so that newly elected Canadian Alliance leader Stockwell Day could enter the House of Commons through a by-election. After the by-election, Hart received a severance payment of $50,000 from the Canadian Alliance, which prompted a Royal Canadian Mounted Police (RCMP) inquiry. The Canadian Alliance maintained that the payment was made to cover lost income between the time of his resignation and the date of the next election, and was not an inducement.

The RCMP inquiry concluded that an investigation was not necessary and that neither Hart nor the Canadian Alliance had committed a criminal offence, and no charges were ever laid in the matter.

Later career
Since leaving Parliament, Hart started a Public and Government Relations business, with clients including the British Columbia Naturopathic Association, and continued to speak publicly about proposed changes to health care regulations in British Columbia.

In 2004 Hart moved to the Republic of Georgia and worked as a parliamentary adviser to H.E. Speaker Nino Burjanadze.

In 2005, Hart received an honorary doctorate from Georgian Technical University for his work in parliament and promoting democracy in Georgia.

In May 2008 the Harts returned to Georgia. Jim accepted the position of Dean, School of Governance at Caucasus University.

In the fall of 2008, Jim Hart was offered a position with Management Systems International (MSI) to work in Baghdad, Iraq as Senior Legislative Adviser on a multi-year contract to assist in strengthening the Council of Representatives (COR) Iraq's national parliament. Mr Hart accepted the position and in June 2009 he was promoted to the position of Chief of Party, heading the field operations and programming of the Iraq Legislative Strengthening Program (ILSP) a multimillion-dollar USAID development program.

Jim Hart has been in demand in the field of parliamentary development since 2004, he has managed parliamentary strengthening programs in the Republic of Georgia, Iraq, and Indonesia. In addition, Hart has been active with assignments observing elections in Ukraine, Georgia, and Afghanistan. The impressive list of clients includes international NGO's, USAID, OSCE and the European Union.

From July 2, 2013 to July 1, 2018 he served as a full-time member of the Pacific Regional Division of the Parole Board of Canada.

Publications
Hart, Jim. Straight from Hart''•

References

External links
 History of Okanagan-Similkameen-Merritt riding
 History of Okanagan Coquihalla riding
 

Living people
1955 births
Canadian Alliance MPs
20th-century Canadian politicians
Canadian Baptists
Members of the House of Commons of Canada from British Columbia
Reform Party of Canada MPs